Sisimiut Airport  is an airport located  northwest of Sisimiut, a town in the Qeqqata municipality in central-western Greenland. The airport has a single runway designated 13/31 which measures , built on the northern shore of Kangerluarsunnguaq Bay.

For scheduled flights, the airport is served exclusively by Air Greenland, serving as a fly-through destination with no aircraft stationed onsite. Operated by Mittarfeqarfiit, it is also used for general aviation purposes.

Airlines and destinations 

Roads in Sisimiut, including the road to the airport, are surfaced, but there is no road linking Sisimiut to any other settlement.

With 5,460 inhabitants in 2010, Sisimiut is the second-largest town in Greenland, one of the few towns in the country exhibiting growth patterns, with corresponding increasing passenger traffic at Sisimiut Airport. Air Greenland pledges to maintain a relatively high number of flights at the airport even should the construction of the road to Kangerlussuaq commence. Apart from the connecting flights to Kangerlussuaq, the busiest routes are the routes to Nuuk, the capital of Greenland, and to Ilulissat, the cultural and business center of Avannaata, the northernmost and second-largest municipality in the country.

History 

Before the airport was opened in the 1990s, Sisimiut had been served by the now-closed heliport, located on the eastern outskirts of the town, in Sisimiut valley.

The construction of Sisimiut Airport was part of the regional airport network extension in Greenland, with several airports built to serve STOL aircraft of Air Greenland − the venerable De Havilland Canada Dash-7s acquired in the preceding decade − planes particularly suited to the often severe weather conditions in Greenland. The other new additions were Maniitsoq Airport in the southern part of the Qeqqata municipality, Aasiaat Airport in western Greenland; Qaarsut Airport and Upernavik Airport in northwestern Greenland.

Future
In the short term, there are plans to extend the runway a little, in connection with the replacement of the Air Greenland fleet.

Since 2000, construction of the  road to Kangerlussuaq has been discussed without resolution. The road would be the first of its kind in Greenland, connecting two settlements, and reducing the need for passenger exchange at Kangerlussuaq Airport, the airline hub.
The plans say that the Sisimiut Airport might be closed after that. That would mean lower cost for the country and the travelers, since an airport is fairly expensive to maintain, but longer travel time, especially domestic. If keeping the airport, the road might be unprofitable. There are also suggestions to build a large airport near Nuuk and close the Kangerlussuaq airport since few people live there and mostly work with the airport. In that case the road would be unneeded. In 2016 there was a decision by the municipality to build a very simple road for 4x4 vehicles between Sisimiut and Kangerlussuaq, costing 15 MDKK. It would be used to transport flight containers and therefore lower freight cost and shop prices in Sisimiut. The ride would be too bumpy and slow for paying bus passengers so the airport would not be affected so much.

Facilities 
There is no deicing equipment at the airport, which is costly and problematic in Greenlandic winter. All passengers connecting through the airport and continuing with the same plane to another destination are required to disembark and undergo regular boarding process checks before they can re-board and continue the flight.

At the terminal there is a Post Greenland box, a soft drink machine and television, and a small exhibition from the Sisimiut Museum. A workstation in kiosk mode provides tourist, municipal and airport related information. Taxis as well as an infrequent town bus service connect the airport with the center of Sisimiut.

References

External links

Greenland Airports

Airports in Greenland
Airports in the Arctic
Davis Strait
Sisimiut